A wall dormer is a dormer whose facial plane is integral with the facial plane of the wall that it is built into, breaking the line of the eaves of a building.

Wall dormers are less commonly seen than typical “roof dormers”. They locate the window flush with the wall plane above or through the cornice line. They are essentially a continuation of the wall above the roof eaves. They are thus more of a vertically projecting wall element than an elaboration of the roof. 

Occasionally, small early buildings are found to have wall dormers. More commonly, later structures (during the period of revival styles in 19th-century architecture) feature wall dormers as an important part of eclectic assemblies of elements that make up such styles as New World Queen Anne Revival architecture and the French-inspired Châteauesque style.

External links

Roofs
Windows